SSVOBB is the acronym for Stichting Studenten Vliegtuigontwikkeling, -bouw en -beheer which is Dutch for Foundation for Students in Airplane development, manufacturing and management.

The Foundation
The SSVOBB is a non-profit-foundation of students in Aerospace Engineering at Delft University of Technology in Delft, Netherlands dedicated to building aircraft with historic or scientific value. Main objective is to apply the knowledge acquired as an engineering student to real aircraft. Volunteers learn that practice quite often differs substantially from the theoretical ideal situation. The organisation was founded on January 19, 1990, when the students organised the building of their first aircraft the Lambach HL II.

Lambach HL II

The original
The original Lambach HL was commissioned by Dutch aviation enthusiasts to try to beat the far superior German aerobatics pilots and aircraft in aerobatics contests. She was completely designed and build within six months by the Dutch engineer and Delft University of Technology graduate Hugo Lambach. The biplane had a steel tube, cloth-covered fuselage, wooden wings and tail and was powered by a Gipsy Major Mk. 1. After test flights she was successful at several air shows where she proved to be a unique aerobatics aircraft, however not quite the quality of the German aircraft. The aircraft was destroyed during a German bombing raid on the Ypenburg airfield near The Hague on May 10, 1940.

Hugo Lambach
Hugo Lambach was a Delft graduate in applied physics. During his study he already designed and built his first aircraft, the Lambach HL.I. After graduation he worked with Koolhoven Vliegtuigfabrieken. With the commissioning of the Lambach HL II he started his own aircraft factory, Lambach Vliegtuigfabrieken, which ultimately only produced one aircraft. After the war he worked with Fokker for several years and had his own engineering company. Hugo Lambach died July 8, 1972.

Replica
The replica started out as a student's joke in 1989 to organise a stunt in honour of the 45th anniversary of the Society of Aerospace Students 'Leonardo da Vinci. Thanks to a complete set of drawings found in the Aviodrome museum and the help of Hugo Lambach's main engineer Willem de Koo, the students managed to complete the aircraft in six years. Her first flight took place on September 18, 1995. The aircraft was demonstrated at several air shows in the Netherlands and Belgium during 1996. In 1997 inspection showed the need for heavy maintenance which has grounded her since.

Currently (2014), maintenance continues on the replica while it is being stored at the Dutch aviation museum Aviodrome.  Current maintenance that is being done on the aircraft is to reinforce the bracket such that it can better handle engine vibrations and updating the panel. The panel needs to be updated to comply with modern regulation, as such the replica will, unlike the original, be equipped with radio and transponder.

The Impuls

In 1994 the society started working on their second project: the Impuls' (Dutch for momentum, registration PH-VXM (velocity times mass)), which was designed by the society's students only. The design started in 1994, but by the summer of 2010 the society decided to freeze the project.

The Impuls concept consisted of a 2-seat FAR-23 certified aircraft, propelled by an engine in a pusher configuration. Other distinctive characteristics were the two tail booms and the large windows ensuring a broad view. Materials characterising the Impuls, were the in the beginning 1990s state of the art glass fibre composite used in wings, tail booms and outer fuselage shell. The inner fuselage however, still consisted of a load carrying steel inner frame as monocoque composite constructions were still very rare back in the '90s.

The S-Vision

In December 2009, SSVOBB Lambach Aircraft decided to freeze the Impuls-project and the remaining time of that academic year was used to make a thorough evaluation of the project.  By the summer of 2010, after having conducted a feasibility study, the society decided to make a second attempt at building an own designed aircraft, which would later be named: S-Vision

Unlike the design of the Impuls, that of the S-Vision is substantially more conventional. The S- Vision will have a low wing, fixed gear and single tail boom.  The aircraft will be certified according to CS-VLA, which was introduced in 2003. Power will be generated by a four-cylinder opposing engine providing 130Hp driving the pull-prop. As the society gained experience in the manufacturing of composites and aluminium during the Impuls-project, these will be the main materials used in the S-Vision.

Design on the S-Vision started in September 2010 and work has now been progressing for nearly four years, during which the conceptual and preliminary design were fully completed. By the spring of 2014 volunteers started working on material testing. Currently (June 2014) volunteers are working on the detailed design.

Aircraft
 Lambach HL.I
 Lambach HL.II

External links
SSVOBB Homepage
Facebook Page

Aircraft manufacturers of the Netherlands
Delft University of Technology